Abbondio Smerghetto (10 March 1931 – 17 October 2018) was an Italian rower. He competed in the men's coxed four event at the 1952 Summer Olympics.

References

External links 
 
 

1931 births
2018 deaths
Italian male rowers
Olympic rowers of Italy
Rowers at the 1952 Summer Olympics
Sportspeople from Venice